Han Zaw (Burmese: ဟန်ဇော်; born 25 February 1946) is a Burmese engineer and Minister for Ministry of Construction (Myanmar) from January 2016 to February 2021.

Early life and education

He was born in Natmauk, Magway Region on 25 February 1946. He graduated from Moscow University. His father, Mya Maung, is a second cousin of General Aung San.

Career

He worked for Ministry of Construction (Myanmar) for many years up to the post of managing director of  Public Works under Ministry of Construction and retired. After the resignation of electricity and energy minister, Pe Zin Htun, construction minister Win Khaing became minister for construction and minister for electricity and energy. On 19 January, President Htin Kyaw appointed Han Zaw as union minister for Ministry of Construction and Win Khaing as electricity and energy minister.

Before that he also served as chairman in Myanmar Engineering Society and still now he is a member of  central executive member of Myanmar Engineering Society.

References

1946 births
Living people
Government ministers of Myanmar